Styloxus is a genus of beetles in the family Cerambycidae, containing the following species:

 Styloxus angelesae Noguera, 2005
 Styloxus bicolor (Champlain & Knull, 1922)
 Styloxus fulleri (Horn, 1880)
 Styloxus fuscus Chemsak & Linsley, 1964
 Styloxus lucanus LeConte, 1873
 Styloxus oblatipilis Chemsak & Linsley, 1964
 Styloxus parvulus Chemsak & Linsley, 1964

References

Xystrocerini